Gaspare Russo (born 27 April 1927) is an Italian politician who served as Mayor of Salerno (1970–1974) and president of Campania (1976–1979).

References

1927 births
Mayors of Salerno
Presidents of Campania
Living people